Winckelmann may refer to:
 George Winckelmann (1884–1962), a Finnish lawyer and a diplomat
 Johann Joachim Winckelmann (1717–1768), a German art historian and archaeologist
 Johann Just Winckelmann (1620–1699), a German writer and historian
 Maria Margarethe Winckelmann (1670–1720), a German astronomer

See also 

 Winkelmann, a surname
 Winkleman, a surname